The Municipal Palace of Miraflores is the current headquarters of the municipal corporation of the Lima district of Miraflores in Peru. It is located at number 400 Larco Avenue, in front of Miraflores Central Park. It was declared a national monument in 1999.

History
The building, the work of the Peruvian architect Luis Miró Quesada Garland, was inaugurated on July 28, 1944, during the municipal management of Mayor Carlos Alzamora, replacing the previous headquarters located in a mansion at the intersection of Bellavista and José Gálvez avenues.

Overview
The Palace is neocolonial in style, and has four floors that house offices and environments for attending the public.

It was built in brick and reinforced concrete. As architectural elements, its corner tower and its façade stand out. In the internal spaces are the town hall, and the rotunda on the second floor, adorned with murals by the Peruvian painter Teodoro Núñez Ureta.

Gallery

See also
Miraflores Central Park
Palacio Municipal de Lima

References

Palaces in Peru
1944 in Peru
Buildings and structures completed in 1944